Yan Yinling ( or in Japanese, ; born February 15, 1976) is a Taiwanese-born, Japan-based swimsuit model, race queen, singer and former professional wrestler. She is called also Yinling of Joytoy (インリン・オブ・ジョイトイ), when she appears on television.

Biography

Career
She began modelling at 16 and started working with photographer Hiraokanovsky Kuratachenko at 19, forming the duo JOYTOY. Kuratachenko is suspected to be in fact Japanese, but he is often labeled a Russian photographer.  Much of their work is politically themed, often infused with symbols and references to communism and the Soviet Union. JOYTOY's campaign has been noteworthy for being overly sexual and provocative in nature. A notable example was an exhibit that was hosted in the National Museum of History in 2004. The exhibit took the form of an anti-war and anti-prejudice art display of mildly erotic photography. 

In  2008, Yinling published an autobiography by the title LOVE ERO-Terrorism/Yinling of JOYTOY. In that same year, she provided the voice for Libido Waterfall, a tertiary character in video game Ryū ga Gotoku Kenzan! who was modeled after Yinling.

Professional wrestling
Yinling also appeared for the professional wrestling promotion Hustle, a venture led by Nobuhiko Takada. She originally appeared under the heel alias "Yinling the Erotic Terrorist", but then appeared as a face, under the name Newling-sama (i.e., 'Mistress Newling'), who was in storyline the Erotic Terrorist's daughter. She was sidelined from promotion when she was shot by a laser beam wielded by The Esperanza during a wrestling match. However, she re-emerged under her evil Yinling persona.

On June 17, 2007, after a match which saw Yinling and TAJIRI lose to Muta the Great and RG, Muta held Yinling down and spat his green mist into her vagina. The green mist apparently contained Muta's sperm and caused Yinling to become pregnant. Yinling would give birth to an egg in the middle of the ring and eventually the egg hatched into 514-pound wrestler Monster Bono. Thus was created a family stable consisting of Yinling, Muta and Bono. Yinling was the beautiful and dominant mother while Muta was the gruff but loving father. The family would wrestle alongside each other for several matches, but due to Muta's absences, she served mainly as wrestler and valet. However, due to her continuous abuse, Bono eventually turned on her, which led to challenging her in the ring. The match between mother and son took place on May 24, 2008, in which Yinling fought valiantly but Bono came out as the victor. Tragically, Bono's finishing big splash accidentally killed Yinling. As she died, he held her in his arms and the two were reconciled (in reality this was to be her retirement match).

Personal life
In 2007, a scandal resulted in Yinling being accused of having ties to the Yakuza. Her management has denied the accusations.

Yinling is a supporter of the Social Democratic Party of Japan which advocates for social welfare reform and alternatives to nuclear energy. In 2010, she attended a conference held Mizuho Fukushima and spoke of the party's policies.

In 2008, she announced her marriage to an anonymous employee of the ZERO1-MAX wrestling agency. In 2010, she revealed that she had given birth to her first child, a son. She currently lives in Taiwan.

Championships and accomplishments
Tokyo Sports
Topic Award (2005)

Discography
Gumin no Koi (2003)
Ai wa Maboroshi (2005)

See also
List of Race Queens

References

External links
Official site - In various languages
Short biography
Payne, Peter. (2002). Yinling of Joytoy DVD review at jmate.com
Official Blog of Yinling

1976 births
Living people
Expatriate television personalities in Japan
Japanese gravure idols
Japanese female professional wrestlers
Actresses from Taipei
Taiwanese emigrants to Japan
Taiwanese female models
Sportspeople from Taipei